The Sturgeon Bay Canal lighthouse is a lighthouse located at the Coast Guard station near Sturgeon Bay in Door County, Wisconsin.

Situated on the east side of the south entrance to the Sturgeon Bay Ship Canal, it was listed in the National Register of Historic Places in 1984, as the Sturgeon Bay Canal Lighthouse. The lighthouse originally was constructed in 1899; instability forced the addition of steel bracing in 1903. It is similar to the reinforced Devils Island Lighthouse.

There are two lighthouses at this location, the other being the Sturgeon Bay Canal North Pierhead Light.

Gallery

Notes

References

Further reading

 Havighurst, Walter (1943) The Long Ships Passing: The Story of the Great Lakes, Macmillan Publishers.
 Oleszewski, Wes, Great Lakes Lighthouses, American and Canadian: A Comprehensive Directory/Guide to Great Lakes Lighthouses, (Gwinn, Michigan: Avery Color Studios, Inc., 1998) .
 
 Sapulski, Wayne S., (2001) Lighthouses of Lake Michigan: Past and Present (Paperback) (Fowlerville: Wilderness Adventure Books) ; .
 Wright, Larry and Wright, Patricia, Great Lakes Lighthouses Encyclopedia Hardback (Erin: Boston Mills Press, 2006) .

External links
Door County Lighthouses, Door County Marine Museum.
Pepper, Terry, Seeing the light, Sturgeon Bay Canal Lighthouse (Archived October 24, 2021)
Lighthouse friends article
NPS Inventory of Historic Light Stations - Wisconsin (Archived October 19, 2006)

Lighthouses completed in 1899
Lighthouses in Door County, Wisconsin
Lighthouses on the National Register of Historic Places in Wisconsin
1899 establishments in Wisconsin
National Register of Historic Places in Door County, Wisconsin